Phone bank, or phonebanking can mean:

A collection of telephones within an organization such as a call centre
A banking institution that does business solely or mostly via telephone.  See telephone banking.
A political campaign strategy to collect voter data and get out the vote. See canvassing.